The Live the Life Tour is a concert tour by singer Rod Stewart to promote his 2013 album, Time.

Background
The Live the Life Tour was officially announced on 4 December 2012 at Stewart's official website. Seven shows were  announced for the United States as well as two Canadian concerts. Shows in New York City, Newark and Greensboro were announced later. By 26 December 2012, the schedule also includes shows in England, Northern Ireland, Ireland, Sweden, Norway, the Netherlands and Germany.

Steve Winwood has been announced to be joining the tour in North America.

In Europe, Moya will be the opening act at fourteen of the fifteen shows (the exception being Oslo).

Tour dates

Festivals and other miscellaneous performances
This concert was a part of "Norwegian Wood"

Cancellations and rescheduled shows

References

2013 concert tours
Rod Stewart concert tours